The 1956 Montana gubernatorial election took place on November 6, 1956. Incumbent Governor of Montana J. Hugo Aronson, who was first elected Governor in 1952, ran for re-election. He was unopposed in the Republican primary and advanced to the general election, where he faced Arnold Olsen, the Attorney General of Montana and the Democratic nominee. Despite the fact that then-President Dwight D. Eisenhower won the state in a landslide that year in the presidential election, Aronson only narrowly defeated Arnold to win his second and final term as governor.

Democratic primary

Candidates
Arnold Olsen, Attorney General of Montana
John W. Bonner, former Governor of Montana
Danny O'Neill, livestock man
J. M. Nickey

Results

Republican primary

Candidates
J. Hugo Aronson, incumbent Governor of Montana

Results

General election

Results

References

Montana
Gubernatorial
1956
November 1956 events in the United States